Derinçay (formerly Hocantı) is a  village in Mut district of Mersin Province, Turkey. The population of the village was 201 as of 2012. The village is an old village founded by Turkmens. The oldest Ottoman documents about the village are of 15th century. Its former name Hocantı may either refer to a certain Hoca Enti, who lived in the Karamanoğlu era, or a settlement in Turkestan. The bridge to the east of the village is a registered as a historical asset by the government. Derinçay economy depends on irrigated farming. Main crops are olives and fruits like apricot, plum, melon and figs.

References

Villages in Mut District